My Heart Is Calling You (French: Mon coeur t'appelle) is the 1934 French version of a German musical film directed by Carmine Gallone and Serge Véber, written by Ernst Marischka, produced by Arnold Pressburger. The film stars Jan Kiepura, Danielle Darrieux and Lucien Baroux. The music score is by Robert Stolz.

Its English (My Heart is Calling) and German language (My Heart Calls You) versions were filmed simultaneously with different cast members, Marta Eggerth playing Danielle Darrieux's role. The film's sets were designed by the art directors Kurt Herlth and Werner Schlichting.

It tells the story of a female tenor singer who ends up triumphing to the opera of Paris.

Cast
 Jan Kiepura as Mario Delmonti  
 Danielle Darrieux as Nicole Nadin  
 Lucien Baroux as Rosé - le directeur  
 Julien Carette as Coq 
 Charles Dechamps as Arvelle - le directeur de l'Opéra 
 Bill Bocket 
 Jeanne Cheirel as La directrice du salon de modes  
 Colette Darfeuil as Margot  
 Rolla France as Vera Valetti  
 André Gabriello as Favrolles  
 Edouard Hamel 
 Hermant 
 Nono Lecorre as Casserole 
 Pierre Piérade
 Paul Kemp as Homme dans le casino

References

Bibliography
 Bock, Hans-Michael & Bergfelder, Tim. The Concise CineGraph. Encyclopedia of German Cinema. Berghahn Books, 2009.

External links

Mon cœur t'appelle at DvdToile

1934 films
1934 musical films
French musical films
Films directed by Carmine Gallone
Films produced by Arnold Pressburger
French black-and-white films
French multilingual films
German multilingual films
Gaumont Film Company films
Films set in Paris
German musical films
Cine-Allianz films
German black-and-white films
1934 multilingual films
Films scored by Robert Stolz
1930s French films
1930s German films